Bug Buster is a 1998 American comedy horror film directed by Lorenzo Doumani. It is the only known film to be written by Malick Khoury. In the United Kingdom, this film was released under the title Some Things Never Die.

Plot
After the mayor uses a potentially dangerous substance to protect the local plantation, the lakeside town of Mountview, in California, is attacked by a lethal species of large cockroach. After some of the town's inhabitants are killed, the mayor enlists the help of eccentric pest exterminator General George S. Merlin in order to prevent further harm to the local dwellers.

Cast
 Randy Quaid as General George S. Merlin
 Brenda Epperson Doumani as Dr. Laura Casey
 Katherine Heigl as Shannon Griffin
 James Doohan as Sheriff Carlson
 George Takei as Dr. Hiro Fujimoto
 Meredith Salenger as Veronica Hart
 David Lipper as Steve Williams
 Doug Jones as The Mother Bug
 Tom Willett as Band Member

Reception
Bug Buster received almost universally negative reviews from audiences and critics alike. Despite this, some viewers enjoyed it, seeing it as a throwback to fifties monster films. Robert Pardi of TV Guide said "this modestly budgeted effort has a certain low key charm."

References

External links
 

1998 direct-to-video films
1998 horror films
American comedy horror films
1998 films
1990s monster movies
American monster movies
1990s comedy horror films
1998 comedy films
1990s English-language films
1990s American films